was a town located in Nakatado District, Kagawa Prefecture, Japan.

As of 2003, the town had an estimated population of 4,681 and a density of 80.51 persons per km². The total area was 58.14 km².

On March 20, 2006, Chūnan, along with the town of Kotonami (also from Nakatado District), was merged into the expanded town of Mannō.

External links
Official website in Japanese

Dissolved municipalities of Kagawa Prefecture
Mannō, Kagawa